Catocala actaea is a moth of the family Erebidae first described by Rudolf Felder and Alois Friedrich Rogenhofer in 1874.

Subspecies
Catocala actaea actaea
Catocala actaea nigricans (Mell, 1939) (Shanxi)

Description
This moths has cryptically coloured forewings. Hindwings are mostly blackish, with a white stripe and a small white spot in the middle.

Distribution
This species can be found in Japan, the Korean Peninsula, the Russian Far East and northern China.

References

External links
Berlov, Oleg E. "Catocala actaea Felder et Rogenhofer, 1874:". olegberlov @ narod.ru. 
"Catocala actaea R.Felder & Rogenhofer, 1874". Insecta.pro.

actaea
Moths of Asia
Moths described in 1874
Taxa named by Alois Friedrich Rogenhofer